Bass River Township is a township in Burlington County, in the U.S. state of New Jersey.  As of the 2020 United States census, the township's population was 1,355, a decrease of 88 (−6.1%) from the 2010 census count of 1,443, which in turn reflected a decline of 67 (−4.4%) from the 1,510 counted in the 2000 census.

Bass River was incorporated as a township by an act of the New Jersey Legislature on March 30, 1864, from portions of Little Egg Harbor Township and Washington Township.

The township's name derives from the Bass River, a  tributary of the Mullica River, that was in turn named for Jeremiah Basse, who served as governor of both West Jersey and East Jersey.

Geography
According to the United States Census Bureau, the township had a total area of 78.41 square miles (203.09 km2), including 75.12 square miles (194.57 km2) of land and 3.29 square miles (8.52 km2) of water (4.19%).

Unincorporated communities, localities and place names located partially or completely within the township include Allens Bridge, Bass River State Forest, Calico, Charcoal Landing, Doctors Point, Frogtown, Harrisville, High Bridge, Leektown, Martha, Merrygold, Munion Field, New Gretna, Oak Island, Oswego Lake, Sim Place, State Forest and Wading River.

The township borders Washington Township and Woodland Township in Burlington County; Galloway Township and Port Republic in Atlantic County; and both Barnegat Township and Little Egg Harbor Township in Ocean County.

The township is one of 56 South Jersey municipalities that are included within the New Jersey Pinelands National Reserve, a protected natural area of unique ecology covering , that has been classified as a United States Biosphere Reserve and established by Congress in 1978 as the nation's first National Reserve. All of the township is included in either the state-designated Pinelands area or the Pinelands National Reserve, which includes portions of Burlington County, along with areas in Atlantic, Camden, Cape May, Cumberland, Gloucester and Ocean counties.

Demographics

2010 census

The Census Bureau's 2006–2010 American Community Survey showed that (in 2010 inflation-adjusted dollars) median household income was $64,185 (with a margin of error of +/− $5,782) and the median family income was $66,364 (+/− $8,461). Males had a median income of $50,625 (+/− $7,486) versus $48,950 (+/− $3,139) for females. The per capita income for the borough was $24,440 (+/− $2,573). About 9.4% of families and 12.3% of the population were below the poverty line, including 18.5% of those under age 18 and 27.8% of those age 65 or over.

2000 census
As of the 2000 United States census, there were 1,510 people, 548 households, and 409 families residing in the township.  The population density was 19.9 people per square mile (7.7/km2).  There were 602 housing units at an average density of 7.9 per square mile (3.1/km2).  The racial makeup of the township was 98.87% White, 0.07% African American, 0.07% Native American, 0.13% Asian, 0.13% from other races, and 0.73% from two or more races. Hispanic or Latino of any race were 2.19% of the population.

There were 548 households, out of which 35.8% had children under the age of 18 living with them, 59.1% were married couples living together, 9.1% had a female householder with no husband present, and 25.2% were non-families. 19.3% of all households were made up of individuals, and 7.1% had someone living alone who was 65 years of age or older.  The average household size was 2.76 and the average family size was 3.15.

In the township the population was spread out, with 26.8% under the age of 18, 8.5% from 18 to 24, 30.3% from 25 to 44, 23.7% from 45 to 64, and 10.7% who were 65 years of age or older.  The median age was 38 years. For every 100 females, there were 103.5 males.  For every 100 females age 18 and over, there were 104.6 males.

The median income for a household in the township was $47,469, and the median income for a family was $51,167. Males had a median income of $35,179 versus $27,222 for females. The per capita income for the township was $20,382.  About 2.4% of families and 5.2% of the population were below the poverty line, including 4.5% of those under age 18 and 7.0% of those age 65 or over.

Government

Local government
Since 1972, Bass River Township has been governed under the Walsh Act by a three-member commission. The township is one of 30 municipalities (of the 564) statewide that use the commission form of government. The governing body comprises three commissioners, who are elected at-large in non-partisan elections held every four years as part of the May municipal election to serve four-year terms of office on a concurrent basis. Each of the Commissioners is appointed to serve as the head of a designated department. The commissioners choose a mayor, who presides over meetings but has no executive role.

 and continuing through May 15, 2024, members of the Bass River Township Board of Commissioners are 
Mayor Deborah Buzby-Cope (Commissioner of Revenue and Finance), 
Deputy Mayor Louis Bourguignon (Commissioner of Public Works, Parks and Public Property) and 
Nicholas Capriglione (Commissioner of Public Affairs and Public Safety).

Emergency services
Like other municipalities in New Jersey without a local police department, Bass River Township is served by troopers from the New Jersey State Police Troop C which maintains a barrack in Tuckerton. The New Jersey State Park Police, which operates a station in Washington Township, is responsible for any matters occurring within state forests.

The New Gretna Volunteer Fire Company provides fire protection for all of Bass River Township. Additionally the Fire Company provides rescue services and operates an EMS First Response vehicle for medical emergencies.

Bass River Township is served by Galloway Township EMS, which also provides primary 911 emergency medical services for the residents of Galloway Township, New Jersey, Port Republic, New Jersey and Egg Harbor City, New Jersey, as well as the campus of Stockton University.

Federal, state, and county representation 
Bass River Township is located in the 3rd Congressional district and is part of New Jersey's 9th state legislative district. 

Prior to the 2010 Census, Bass River Township had been part of the 3rd Congressional district, a change made by the New Jersey Redistricting Commission that took effect in January 2013, based on the results of the November 2012 general elections. In redistricting following the 2010 census, the township was in the 2nd congressional district, which was in effect from 2013 to 2022.

 

Burlington County is governed by a Board of County Commissioners comprised of five members who are chosen at-large in partisan elections to serve three-year terms of office on a staggered basis, with either one or two seats coming up for election each year; at an annual reorganization meeting, the board selects a director and deputy director from among its members to serve a one-year term. , Burlington County's Commissioners are
Director Felicia Hopson (D, Willingboro Township, term as commissioner ends December 31, 2024; term as director ends 2023),
Deputy Director Tom Pullion (D, Edgewater Park, term as commissioner and as deputy director ends 2023),
Allison Eckel (D, Medford, 2025),
Daniel J. O'Connell (D, Delran Township, 2024) and 
Balvir Singh (D, Burlington Township, 2023). 
Burlington County's Constitutional Officers are
County Clerk Joanne Schwartz (R, Southampton Township, 2023)
Sheriff James H. Kostoplis (D, Bordentown, 2025) and 
Surrogate Brian J. Carlin (D, Burlington Township, 2026).

Politics
As of March 2011, there were a total of 892 registered voters in Bass River Township, of which 187 (21.0% vs. 33.3% countywide) were registered as Democrats, 291 (32.6% vs. 23.9%) were registered as Republicans and 413 (46.3% vs. 42.8%) were registered as Unaffiliated. There as one voter registered to another party. Among the township's 2010 Census population, 61.8% (vs. 61.7% in Burlington County) were registered to vote, including 77.4% of those ages 18 and over (vs. 80.3% countywide).

In the 2012 presidential election, Republican Mitt Romney received 371 votes (59.0% vs. 40.2% countywide), ahead of Democrat Barack Obama with 236 votes (37.5% vs. 58.1%) and other candidates with 15 votes (2.4% vs. 1.0%), among the 629 ballots cast by the township's 945 registered voters, for a turnout of 66.6% (vs. 74.5% in Burlington County). In the 2008 presidential election, Republican John McCain received 423 votes (60.6% vs. 39.9% countywide), ahead of Democrat Barack Obama with 260 votes (37.2% vs. 58.4%) and other candidates with 12 votes (1.7% vs. 1.0%), among the 698 ballots cast by the township's 917 registered voters, for a turnout of 76.1% (vs. 80.0% in Burlington County). In the 2004 presidential election, Republican George W. Bush received 408 votes (61.8% vs. 46.0% countywide), ahead of Democrat John Kerry with 240 votes (36.4% vs. 52.9%) and other candidates with 9 votes (1.4% vs. 0.8%), among the 660 ballots cast by the township's 892 registered voters, for a turnout of 74.0% (vs. 78.8% in the whole county).

In the 2013 gubernatorial election, Republican Chris Christie received 314 votes (72.5% vs. 61.4% countywide), ahead of Democrat Barbara Buono with 100 votes (23.1% vs. 35.8%) and other candidates with 13 votes (3.0% vs. 1.2%), among the 433 ballots cast by the township's 964 registered voters, yielding a 44.9% turnout (vs. 44.5% in the county). In the 2009 gubernatorial election, Republican Chris Christie received 298 votes (62.1% vs. 47.7% countywide), ahead of Democrat Jon Corzine with 140 votes (29.2% vs. 44.5%), Independent Chris Daggett with 34 votes (7.1% vs. 4.8%) and other candidates with 5 votes (1.0% vs. 1.2%), among the 480 ballots cast by the township's 920 registered voters, yielding a 52.2% turnout (vs. 44.9% in the county).

Education 
The Bass River Township School District serves students in pre-kindergarten through sixth grade at Bass River Township Elementary School. As of the 2018–19 school year, the district, comprised of one school, had an enrollment of 106 students and 12.8 classroom teachers (on an FTE basis), for a student–teacher ratio of 8.3:1. In the 2016–2017 school year, Bass River had the 10th-smallest enrollment of any school district in the state, with 102 students.

Students in seventh through twelfth grades attend the schools of the Pinelands Regional School District, which also serves students from Eagleswood Township, Little Egg Harbor Township and Tuckerton Borough. As of the 2018–19 school year, the high school district, comprised of two schools, had an enrollment of 1,572 students and 152.6 classroom teachers (on an FTE basis), for a student–teacher ratio of 10.3:1. Schools in the district (with 2018–2019 enrollment data from the National Center for Education Statistics) are 
Pinelands Regional Junior High School with 811 students in grades 7–9 and 
Pinelands Regional High School with 744 students in grades 10–12. The district's board of education is comprised of nine members directly elected by the residents of the constituent municipalities to three-year terms on a staggered basis, with three seats up for election each year. Seats on the high school district's board of education are allocated based on the population of the constituent municipalities, with one seat allocated to Bass River Township.

Students from Bass River Township, and from all of Burlington County, are eligible to attend the Burlington County Institute of Technology, a countywide public school district that serves the vocational and technical education needs of students at the high school and post-secondary level at its campuses in Medford and Westampton Township.

Transportation

Roads and highways

Bass River Township is the only municipality in Burlington County that hosts U.S. Route 9 and the Garden State Parkway. The two roads enter from the southwest concurrently, then separate at Exit 50. Exit 50 is one of two partial interchanges on the parkway that are located in Bass River, with Exit 50 being northbound off-southbound on. The other exit, Exit 52 for County Route 654 in New Gretna, is northbound on-southbound off. The township also hosts a high-speed toll plaza on the mainline northbound Garden State Parkway.

Other state and county-maintained roads that pass through include Route 167 (a  dead-ended old alignment of U.S. 9) and County Route 542.

Public transportation
NJ Transit provides service in the township on the 559 route that runs between Atlantic City and Lakewood Township.

Notable people

People who were born in, residents of, or otherwise closely associated with Bass River Township include:

 Andy Boswell (1873–1936), Major League Baseball pitcher who served in the New Jersey General Assembly
 Thomas A. Mathis (1869–1958), political boss and racketeer who served in the New Jersey Senate and was the Secretary of State of New Jersey

References

External links

Official website

 
1864 establishments in New Jersey
Populated places in the Pine Barrens (New Jersey)
Populated places established in 1864
Townships in Burlington County, New Jersey
Walsh Act